The Post Human Condition is the second studio album by progressive metal band, No More Pain. It was recorded, mixed, and mastered at Lakehouse Recording Studios in Asbury Park, New Jersey. It is a concept album based on the world's content over-consumption of technology.

It was self released on January 1, 2015. It was released in Japan on June 24, 2015 on with a digital exclusive bonus track.

A video was released for the song "Bleed".

Track listing

Personnel
 Mike Roman - vocals, guitar, keyboards
 Matt McDermott - keyboards
 John Moroney - bass
 Dan Rainone -  drums, percussion

Additional musicians
 Mike Rainone - additional vocals on "God In The Glass" and "The Network"

Production
 Engineered by Tim Pannella and Erik Kase Romero
 Mixed and mastered by Tim Pannella at Lakehouse Recording Studios in Asbury Park, NJ
 Additional recording by Lou Morreale IV at Studio IV
 Artwork by Gregg Bautista

References

2015 albums
No More Pain (band) albums
Concept albums